What I Did for Love may refer to:

 "What I Did for Love" (A Chorus Line), a song from the musical A Chorus Line
 "What I Did for Love" (David Guetta song), 2015
 "What I Did for Love", a song and single by Kenny Rogers from Love Is Strange 1990
What I did for Love, a 1998 French film starring Raquel Welch